Californidine is an alkaloid with the molecular formula C20H20NO4+.  It has been isolated from extracts of the California poppy (Eschscholzia californica), from which it gets its name, and from other plants of the genus Eschscholzia.

Pharmaceutical use

Because of the sedative, anxiolytic, and analgesic effects, the herb California Poppy (Amapola de California, Eschscholzia californica, Pavot d'Amérique, Pavot d'Or, Pavot de Californie, Poppy California, Yellow Poppy) is currently sold in pharmacies in many countries.

Horticulturalist Alys Fowler wrote in 2022 that the California poppy "makes the most wonderful tea. You can use aerial parts: flowers, stems, leaves, fresh or dried. It is a gentle tea that can reduce anxiety and aid sleep. It contains none of the alkaloids associated with opium poppies.""

References

Quaternary ammonium compounds
Benzylisoquinoline alkaloids
Oxygen heterocycles